Events in the year 2018 in Lebanon.

Incumbents
President: Michel Aoun 
Prime Minister: Saad Hariri

Events

6 May – The 2018 Lebanese general election was held; 128 members from 15 districts were elected to the Parliament.
30 September – The Miss Lebanon 2018 beauty pageant had 30 candidates, and was won by Maya Reaidy.

Deaths

14 March – Emily Nasrallah, writer and women's rights activist (b. 1931).
4 July – Ali Qanso, politician (b. 1947/1948).
1 October – Antoine Sfeir, journalist and professor (b. 1948).

References

 
2010s in Lebanon
Years of the 21st century in Lebanon
Lebanon
Lebanon